Tad Robinson (born June 24, 1956) is an American singer, harmonica player, and songwriter.

Robinson was born and raised in New York City. He graduated the New Lincoln School and attended Indiana University's school of music and graduating in 1980. He played regionally with a group called the Hesitation Blues Band, then moved to Chicago, where he became the vocalist for Dave Specter & the Bluebirds, singing on their 1994 album Blueplicity for Delmark Records. In 1994, he released his first album under his own name on the same label; seven more have followed, five on the Severn imprint.

Robinson has performed at notable festivals in several countries, including the United States, Austria, Belgium, France, Germany, the Netherlands, and Switzerland. He has been a Hohner harmonica endorsee since 1985.

Discography
Solo
One to Infinity (Delmark Records, 1994)
Last Go Round (Delmark Records, 1998)
Did You Ever Wonder? (Severn Records, 2004)
A New Point of View (Severn Records, 2007)
Back in Style (Severn Records, 2010)
Day Into Night (Severn Records, 2015)
Real Street (Severn Records, 2019)

With The Hesitation Blues Band
Bring It in the Alley (Jelly Roll Records, 1979)

With Big Shoulders
Big Shoulders (Rounder Records, 1989)

With Dave Specter & The Bluebirds
Blueplicity (Delmark Records, 1994)
Live in Europe (Delmark Records; CrossCut Records, 1994)
Live in Chicago [CD and DVD] (Delmark Records, 2008)

With B.B. & The Blues Shacks
Live at Lucerne Blues Festival, (Stumble Records, 1998)

Other releases
Best Kept Secret – Blues Harmonica [with Mitch Kashmar, Mark DuFresne, Steve Bailey] (Thumbs Up Records, 2004)

Film work
Under Siege (1992) - composer, "Sea of Blues", "Love You To Death", "Rap Mama Goose"; actor/performer (singer for 'Bad Billy & The Bail Jumpers')
A Perfect Murder (1998) - performer, "Sands of Time"
The Guardian (2006) - performer, "Hold Tight"

Awards
 2005 – W.C. Handy Blues Award, Soul Blues Album of the Year (nominated)
 2005 – W.C. Handy Blues Award, Soul Blues Male Artist of the Year (nominated)
 2008 – Blues Music Award, Soul Blues Album of the Year (nominated)
 2008 – Blues Music Award, Soul Blues Male Artist of the Year (nominated)
 2009 – Blues Music Award, Soul Blues Male Artist of the Year (nominated)
 2011 – Blues Music Award, Soul Blues Album of the Year (nominated)
 2011 – Blues Music Award, Soul Blues Male Artist of the Year (nominated)
 2016 – Blues Music Award, Soul Blues Album of the Year (nominated)

References

External links
 
 
 

1956 births
Living people
American blues singers
American male singers
Singers from New York (state)
Soul-blues musicians